Gschwend may refer to:

Places

 Gschwend, a town in the German state of Baden-Württemberg
 Mrtvice, Kočevje, Gschwend in German, a settlement northwest of the town of Kočevje in southern Slovenia

People
 Brigitte Gyr-Gschwend (born 1964), Swiss Olympic cyclist
 Philip Gschwend, American engineer
 Ralfonso Gschwend (born 1959), Swiss kinetic sculptor